Waves most often refers to:

Waves, oscillations accompanied by a transfer of energy that travel through space or mass.
Wind waves, surface waves that occur on the free surface of bodies of water.

Waves may also refer to:

Music
Waves (band)

Albums
 Waves (Charles Lloyd album)
 Waves (Jade Warrior album)
 Waves (Katrina and the Waves album)
 Waves (Moving Mountains album)
 Waves (Rachel Platten album)
 Waves (Rhydian Roberts album)
 Waves (Sam Rivers album)
 Waves (Story Untold album)
 Waves (Terje Rypdal album)
 Waves (Waves album)
 Waves: Radio 1 Sessions 90–94, a compilation album by Ride
 Waves (Mick Jenkins EP)
 Waves (Azure Ray EP)
 Waves, one of the original titles for the Kanye West album, The Life of Pablo
 Waves, a 2005 album by Eric Andersen

Songs
 "Waves" (Blancmange song), 1983
 "Waves" (Dean Lewis song), 2016
 "Waves" (Kanye West song), 2016
 "Waves" (Luke Bryan song), 2021
 "Waves" (Mono Band song), 2005
 "Waves" (Mr. Probz song), 2013
 "Waves" (Normani song), 2018
 "Waves", a song by Camille from the album Music Hole, 2008
 "Waves", a 2018 song by Chloe Moriondo
 "Waves", a song by Guided by Voices from the album Let's Go Eat the Factory, 2012
 "Waves", a song by Holly Miranda from the album The Magician's Private Library, 2010
 "Waves", a song by Imagine Dragons from the album Mercury – Acts 1 & 2, 2022
 "Waves", a song by Joey Badass from the mixtape 1999, 2012
 "Waves", a song by Kris Allen from the album Letting You In, 2016
 "Waves", a song by Miguel from the album Wildheart, 2015
 "Waves", a song by Phish from the album Round Room, 2002
 "Waves", a song by Slowdive from the album Just for a Day, 1991
 "Waves", a song by Snoop Dogg and October London from the EP 220, 2018
 "Waves", a song by Underground Lovers from the album Leaves Me Blind, 1992
 "The Waves", by Bastille from Doom Days

Other uses
WAVES, the Women Accepted for Volunteer Emergency Service (United States Navy)
Waves (airline)
Waves, North Carolina
Waves (festival)
Waves (hairstyle)
WAVES (New Zealand), a New Zealand anti-vaccination group
Waves (Juno), an experiment aboard the Juno spacecraft
Waves (film), a 2019 drama film
The Waves, 1931 Virginia Woolf novel

See also

WAVS 1170 AM, Davie, Florida, USA
Waves Radio 101.2 FM, Peterhead, Scotland, UK
Waves Audio
Waves '98
Wavves (band), U.S. rock band
Wavves (album), 2008 Wavves album
Wavvves (album), 2009 Wavves album

Wave (disambiguation)